Fullers Group Limited, trading as Fullers360, is a ferry and tourism company in Auckland, New Zealand. It operates in the Hauraki Gulf and Waitemata Harbour. Fullers Group is the latest in a long line of almost continuous harbour and gulf ferry operations based in Auckland since the 1870s.

History
George Hudson, and his son, Douglas, conceived an idea for an improved ferry operator to replace the neglected Auckland ferry services during a sailing trip on Waitemata Harbour in 1981. By the end of that year, the Hudson family acquired North Shore Ferries (from Leo Dromgoole), another ferry company in Auckland and renaming it the Devonport Steam Ferry Group (which Gulf Ferries Ltd was a part of) (To celebrate the name of the company founded by Ewen W.Allison nearly 100 years before). However, the difficulties and hardships of rejuvenating a failing fleet became apparent almost immediately, as within six weeks of the takeover, every vessel was out of service, except for the Glen Rosa, a small Launch (boat).

The transition to a modern operation began in 1987 with the arrival of the Quickcat, Gulf Ferries first catamaran. Creating a faster, more efficient ferry service to Waiheke Island and other destinations. This was continued with the Kea (Built by WECO in Whangarei) being introduced in 1988 to operate the Auckland City to Devonport service.  For the tourism services, two new catamaran ferries from World Heritage Cruises, Adventurer and Wanderer, were purchased in 2006 and 2007 for NZ$3 million and NZ$2 million respectively. These vessels will also assist on the company's main ferry routes during peak hours.

In 1988, South Pacific Travel Holdings Ltd became shareholders before the publicly listed Fullers Corporation Ltd went into receivership. Recognizing the value of the "Fullers" brand, the company amalgamated its operations and changed its name to Fullers Group Limited. Stagecoach New Zealand became the major shareholder of Fullers Group Limited but kept George Hudson as chairman until 2007 where his son, Douglas Hudson became the CEO until 2017 when Mike Horne took over the position. In 2009, Brian Souter acquired the company as well as another ferry company, 360 Discovery Limited. Both are now part of the InMotion Group.

In 2018 Fullers and 360 Discovery decided to merge brands to become a more cohesive and consumer-friendly ferry operator creating Fullers360.

Services 
Fullers Group runs ferries from the Auckland Ferry Terminal in Quay Street, Downtown Auckland under the Fullers360 branding. Fullers360 operates to:

Auckland suburbs of:

 Devonport
 Bayswater
 Beach Haven
 Birkenhead
 Northcote
 Half Moon Bay near the eastern suburb of Howick
 Hobsonville Point
 Gulf Harbour

Hauraki Gulf Island destinations of:

 Waiheke Island
 Rotoroa Island
 Motutapu Island
 Rangitoto Island

Along with:

 Coromandel Peninsula

Fullers Group owns and operates the Waiheke Bus Company providing public transportation to Waiheke Island.

Fullers also operates tourism packages and tours alongside ferry services at its island destinations.

Vessels

The vessels of Fullers360 include:

 Adventurer: catamaran, ex–World Heritage Cruises Tasmania, Built by RDM, Tasmania
 D5: catamaran, ex–Explore Group ferry, painted in Fullers scheme
 D6: catamaran, ex–Explore Group ferry
 D7: catamaran, ex–Explore Group ferry 
 Discovery II: catamaran, also known as D2
 Discovery III: catamaran, also known as D3
 Harbour Cat: catamaran, launched in 1996, originally named Pakatoa Cat, extended from original length. Oceania Marine
 Ika Kakahi: catamaran, ex-Capricornian Dancer, Auckland to Devonport/Waiheke Island services. Refit Oceania Marine, entered service 2019
 Kea: longitudinally symmetrical catamaran built in 1988 and used on the Auckland CBD – Devonport service
 Kekeno: catamaran, ex-Capricornian Surfer, Auckland to Devonport/Waiheke Island services. Refit Oceania Marine, entered service 2019
 Korora: catamaran built by Q-West, primarily for Auckland–Waiheke service
 Osprey: 22-metre catamaran, particularly used on Bayswater services
 Quickcat: catamaran built in 1987 and runs the Auckland–Waiheke service
 Takahē: catamaran, ex Fantasea Cruises. joined fleet in 2014
 Te Kotuku: catamaran built by Q-West, 2014
 Tiger Cat: catamaran homebuilt in 1995 purchased by Fullers in 2002
 Tiri Kat: former QuickCat II, catamaran built in 1993
 Torea: catamaran built by Q-West 2017, primarily Auckland–Waiheke service
 D1 ex-Explore group ferry recently sold back to Fullers360
Te Maki ex-Explore group ferry built 2017, 24-metre.

Former vessels include:
 Superflyte: Wavemaster International, Henderson built 1995, Parked. Whangarei
 Seaflyte: Wavemaster International, Henderson, Currently named Milford Explorer
 Jet Raider Sold off to Tonga 2017
 Wanderer catamaran built 1996 with Auckland transport running Devenport/Half moon bay/Birkenhead
 Starflyte catamaran built 1999 now with Auckland Transport

Awards, partnership and sponsors
In 2009, Fullers Ferries received a Cycle Friendly Award from Cycling Advocates' Network for the best cycle-friendly commitment by a business in New Zealand.

Fullers is also the travel partner for The Partners Life DUAL, a multi event competition helping support the Motutapu and Rangitoto islands conservation efforts.

The New Zealand Department of Conservation also receive free travel to help promote the Pest Free Islands Initiative along with supporting Kiwi Releases on the Rotoroa Island.

See also 
 Public transport in Auckland

References

External links

 Fullers Auckland (official company website)
 Fullerswatch—Waiheke Island watchdog site on the Fullers transport monopoly to that island

Companies based in Auckland
Ferry companies of New Zealand
Public transport in Auckland
Waiheke Island
New Zealand companies established in 1981
Transport companies established in 1981